"Baddest Ruffest" is a 2001 song by Backyard Dog. It made No. 15 on the UK Singles Chart, and was used as Coca-Cola's 2002 FIFA World Cup theme in the UK, and in the films Ali G Indahouse and Bend It Like Beckham.

References

2001 songs
2001 singles
East West Records singles
English electronic songs